Zorana Arunović (born 22 November 1986) is a Serbian sport shooter. She won 10 metre air pistol event at the 2010 World Shooting Championships and was later named Serbian Sportswoman of The Year by the Olympic Committee of Serbia. She also won individual gold medals in 10 m air pistol event at 2017 European Championships, and 2015 and 2019 European Games.

Career
Arunović became interested in shooting because of her older sister Jelena. She began to train in 2001 at the shooting club Policajac, and later moved to SK Crvena Zvezda.

She won silver team medal in Junior event at the European 10 m Events Championships in 2004 in Győr, and bronze team medal the following year in Tallinn, respectively. She won individual and team gold in the same event in 2006 in Moscow. Later in the year, Arunović won individual gold in 25 m pistol and team bronze in 10 m air pistol in Junior events at the 2006 World Shooting Championships in Zagreb. At the 2009 Mediterranean Games in Pescara, she won gold medal in 10 m air pistol.

Arunović made breakthrough in 2010, when she won individual gold medal in 10 m air pistol, and both individual and team silver in 25 m pistol, alongside her sister Jelena and legendary sports shooter Jasna Šekarić, at the 2010 World Shooting Championships in Munich. The win also made her the first woman athlete to secure quota for Serbia for the London 2012 Summer Olympics. In September 2010, she climbed to first place in the ISSF world ranking in women's 10 m air pistol. At the end of the year, she was named Serbian Sportswoman of The Year by the Olympic Committee of Serbia. Arunović received Serbia's sport association "May award" in 2011. She won a silver medal in 25 m pistol at the 2011 Summer Universiade in Shenzhen.

Arunović finished 4th in Women's 25 metre pistol and 7th in Women's 10 metre air pistol at the 2012 Summer Olympics in London.

She competed at the 2016 Summer Olympics in Rio in the Women's 10 metre air pistol and Women's 25 metre pistol, but failed to progress to the final.

In 2021, she competed in three events at the 2020 Summer Olympics in Tokyo, including new Mixed 10 metre air pistol team event, where she teamed up with longtime partner Damir Mikec to finish in 4th place.

Arunović won individual bronze medal in 10 m air pistol at the 2022 World Shooting Championships in Cairo, to secure first quota for Serbia for the Paris 2024 Summer Olympics, just as she did for the previous Olympic Games, when she qualified by winning individual silver medal at the 2018 World Shooting Championships.

Olympic results

Records

Personal
She has studied Ukrainian, Russian and English.

References

External links

Official website

Serbian female sport shooters
Living people
Sportspeople from Belgrade
1986 births
Olympic shooters of Serbia
Shooters at the 2012 Summer Olympics
Shooters at the 2016 Summer Olympics
Shooters at the 2015 European Games
World record holders in shooting
European champions for Serbia
European Games gold medalists for Serbia
European Games medalists in shooting
Mediterranean Games gold medalists for Serbia
Competitors at the 2009 Mediterranean Games
Competitors at the 2013 Mediterranean Games
Universiade medalists in shooting
ISSF pistol shooters
Mediterranean Games medalists in shooting
Universiade silver medalists for Serbia
Shooters at the 2019 European Games
European Games silver medalists for Serbia
Medalists at the 2011 Summer Universiade
Shooters at the 2020 Summer Olympics
21st-century Serbian women